Khôr Angar is a town in the northern Obock Region of Djibouti. It is situated on the west coast of the Bab el Mandeb Strait.

Overview
Khôr ‘Angar is located in west coast of the Bab el Mandeb Strait and in the north-east of the Republic of Djibouti,  (by road) of Djibouti City. Nearby towns and villages include Moulhoule (27 km), Obock (59 km), Rahayta (48 km).

Climate
The warmest month of the year is July with an average temperature of 34.9 °C. An annual low is reached in January, when the average temperature is 26.3 °C. The difference in precipitation between the driest and wettest month is 9 mm. The average temperatures vary during the year by 8.6 °C. The sky is always clear and bright throughout the year.

Notes

References
Khôr ‘Angar

External links
Satellite map at Maplandia.com

Populated places in Djibouti
Obock Region